The Others is a 1974 French drama film directed by Hugo Santiago. It was entered into the 1974 Cannes Film Festival.

Cast
 Maurice Born - Durtain
 Noëlle Chatelet - Valérie
 Patrice Dally - Roger Spinoza
 Pierrette Destanque - Agnès
 Bruno Devoldère - Mathieu Spinoza
 Dominique Guezenec - Béatrice Alain
 Pierre Julien - M. Marcel
 Marc Monnet - Vidal
 Roger Planchon - Alexis Artaxerxès
 Jean-Daniel Pollet - Adam
 Daniel Vignat - Lucien Moreau

References

External links

1974 films
French drama films
1970s French-language films
1974 drama films
Films directed by Hugo Santiago
1970s French films